Napartok Bay is a long narrow inlet or bay in Labrador at . It contains the northernmost boreal forest along the eastern coast of North America.

References

Bays of Newfoundland and Labrador